Naogaon Medical College is a government medical school in Naogaon, Bangladesh, founded in 2018 and affiliated with Rajshahi Medical University. The class of the first batch of 50 students was commenced on January 10, 2019, on its temporary campus of Naogaon Sadar Hospital.

References

Medical colleges in Bangladesh
Naogaon District
2018 establishments in Bangladesh
Educational institutions established in 2018
Education in Bangladesh